Heritage Property Act may refer to:
Heritage Property Act (Nova Scotia)
Heritage Property Act (Saskatchewan)

See also
Historic preservation legislation